Stacie Cassarino (born 1975) is an American poet, educator, editor, and mother. She is the author of two collections of poems, Each Luminous Thing (forthcoming) and Zero at the Bone, and a monograph, Culinary Poetics and Edible Images in Twentieth-Century American Literature.

Biography 
Born in Hartford, Connecticut of Italian (Neapolitan/Sicilian) heritage, she is a dual citizen of the United States and Italy. She is a graduate of Middlebury College (BA, 1997), University of Washington (MA, 2000), and UCLA (PhD, 2014).

She has lived in Venice, California; Brooklyn, New York; Seattle, Washington; and Portland, Oregon; as well as abroad in Italy, England, Costa Rica, and Brazil.

She lives in Vermont with her three daughters.

Career
She is currently a Visiting Assistant Professor at Middlebury College. She previously taught at UCLA, Fairfield University, and Pratt Institute. In 2022, students at Middlebury organized for the renewal of her position and collected testimonials.

She was formerly a Copy Editor at ELLE.com.

She has also worked as a private chef, and cooked at Babbo in New York City and Cafe Lago in Seattle.

Her most recent book of poems, Each Luminous Thing, won the 2022 Lexi Rudnitsky Editors' Choice Award and will be published by Persea Books in Fall 2023.

Her first collection of poetry, Zero at the Bone, was published by New Issues Press in 2009 to critical acclaim. It won a 2010 Lambda Literary Award, and the Audre Lorde Award.

In 2005, she won the 92Y "Discovery"/The Nation Joan Leiman Jacobson Poetry Prize. She also received a major award from the Astraea Foundation Writer's Fund in 2007, and was a finalist for the Rona Jaffe Writers’ Award.

Her poetry, which deals with subjects such as place, desire, and loss, has been published in notable literary journals such as Poetry Northwest, The New Republic, Verse Daily, Gulf Coast, Crazyhorse, Iowa Review, Georgia Review, AGNI, and the Comstock Review (where she was awarded the 2003 winning poem). Her poem "Summer Solstice" was featured on Garrison Keillor's The Writers’ Almanac on NPR in 2011.

Her work has been widely commented on, by poets such as the British writer Glyn Maxwell who reviewed the collection stating: "Cassarino's voice ranges far and near, from the gasp and sigh of creaturely love to the dizzying spaces of American distance, whiteness, silence. Few poets these days can draw their lines so strongly..."

Her second book, Culinary Poetics and Edible Images in Twentieth-Century Literature, connects foodscapes to aesthetic movements, demonstrating how American writers responded to the changing tastes of the nation.

References

Sources 
 Zero at the Bone (2008, New Issues Press)
 Author Biography at New Issues Press
 "Cures for Love" (AGNI, 2007)
 Discovery/The Nation 2005 Prize Winners and poem "Midwest Eclogue"
 Poem: "Goldfish are Ordinary" at Poets.org
  Review of Zero at the Bone by poet and critic Ron Slate

1975 births
Living people
Middlebury College alumni
American women poets
Lambda Literary Award for Lesbian Poetry winners
American LGBT poets
21st-century American poets
21st-century American women writers
American lesbian writers